Constantin Brăiloiu (13 August 1893 in Bucharest – 20 December 1958 in Geneva) was a Romanian composer and internationally known ethnomusicologist.

Brăiloiu was born in Bucharest. He studied in Bucharest (1901–1907), Vienna (1907–1909), Vevey and Lausanne (1909–1912) as well as Paris (1912–1914). In 1920 he founded the Societatea Compozitorilor Român (SCR, Society of Romanian Composers) along with other composers, and he served as general secretary of the organization between 1926 and 1943.

In 1928 he initiated the composer's collective Arhiva de folklore (folklore archive), which soon became one of the largest folk music archives of its time. From 1928 he and sociology professor Dimitrie Gusti visited the various regions of Romania in order to make sound recordings. In 1931 he published the article "Schiţa unei metode de folclor muzical" (Sketch of a method for music folklore), which became one of the foundational texts for ethnomusicology.

In 1943 he became cultural consultant for the Romanian embassy in Bern. Due to the political incidents in his homeland he stayed from then on in Switzerland. In 1944 he organized another archive in Geneva, Les Archives internationales de musique populaire (AIMP), that was part of the Musée d'ethnographie de Genève (Geneva Museum of Ethnography). He served as director for the AIMP from 1944 until his death in 1958, and collected musical recordings from all over the world. In particular, between 1951 and 1958 he released 40 volumes in the series Collection universelle de musique populaire enregistrée (Universal collection of recorded popular music) on 78 rpm records. In 1948 he became assistant professor (maître de conférence) at the CNRS in Paris.

Brăiloiu was a corresponding member of the Romanian Academy from 1946.

Writings 
 Schiţa unei metode de folclor muzical ("Esquisse d'une méthode de folklore musical"). In: Boabe de Grâu, Jg. 2, Nr. 4, 1931.
 Sur une ballade roumaine : (la Mioritza). Kundig, Geneva 1946.
 A propos du Jodel. In: Kongressbericht der Internationalen Gesellschaft für Musikwissenschaft, 4. Kongress, Basel 1949. Bärenreiter Verlag, Basel 1951, S. 69–71.
 Le rythme aksak. Abbeville 1952.
 Sur une mélodie russe. In: Pierre Souvtchinsky, Vladimir Fédorov, Gisèle Brelet (Hrsg.): Musique russe. Presses universitaires de France, Paris 1953.
 Le vers populaire roumain chanté. Ed. de l'Institut universitaire roumain Charles I, Paris 1956.
 La rythmique enfantine : notions liminaires. Elsevier, Paris/Brussels 1956.
 Folklore musical. Encyclopédie de la musique; Fasquelle, Paris 1959.
 Réflexions sur la création musicale collective. In: Diogène. (Paris) Nr. 25, 1959, S. 83–93.
 Vie musicale d'un village: recherches sur le répertoire de Dragus (Roumanie) 1929-1932. Institut universitaire roumain Charles Ier, Paris 1960.
 Problèmes d'ethnomusicologie. Minkoff Reprint, Geneva 1973. (Collected works edited by Gilbert Rouget)
 Problems of ethnomusicology. Cambridge University Press, Cambridge 1984. (English translation by A.L. Lloyd of the collected works), digitally printed (Cambridge 2009)  (hbk.),  (pbk.)
 Opere 1-5. Ed. Muzicală a Uniunii compozitorilor din Republica Socialistă România, Bukarest, Bd. 1: 1967, Bd. 2: 1969, Bd. 3: 1974, Bd. 4: 1979, Bd. 5: 1981. (Collected works, translated and edited by )
 Opere 6. Prima Parte. Editura Muzicală, Bucharest 1998. (with Emilia Comişel)

References

External links 
 Biography on the website of Musée d'Ethnographie de Genève (French)
 Online data bank of the Brailoiu collection of recordings

1893 births
1958 deaths
20th-century composers
Romanian composers
Romanian ethnomusicologists
Corresponding members of the Romanian Academy
Musicians from Bucharest
Romanian expatriates in Switzerland
Romanian defectors
20th-century musicologists
Lausanne Conservatory alumni